After Darkness (2014) is a novel by Australian author Christine Piper. It won The Australian/Vogel Literary Award in 2014 and was shortlisted for the Miles Franklin Award in 2015.

Plot summary
The novel follows the story, told in three intertwined narrative strands, of Tomakazu Ibaraki, a Japanese doctor living in Australia around the time of World War II. The first strand deals with Ibaraki's arrival in a detainment camp in South Australia in 1942 after the outbreak of war; the second with Ibaraki's arrival in Broome in 1938 to work in a hospital there; and the third concerns his marriage in Tokyo in 1934.

Reviews
 David Messer in Sydney Morning Herald noted the novel "addresses timeless themes such as friendship, personal conscience and others less welcome – racism, nationalism and the way a commitment to bureaucracy can lead to the worst excesses and injustices."  
 Linda Funnell in The Newtown Review of Books stated: "This is a thoughtful and beautifully put together novel; it is not easy in parts, but its trajectory is ultimately one of hope, and in its humanity glows like the lanterns launched onto Broome's Roebuck Bay".
 Joanne Peulen of Booklover Book Reviews stated: "There is an understated and refined, almost ageless quality, to Piper’s prose. Any musician understands it is the quieter passages of a concerto that draw in the listener and heighten their emotional engagement with a piece. Piper has translated this knowledge to the pages of After Darkness.

Awards and nominations
 2014 winner The Australian/Vogel Literary Award 
 2015 shortlisted Indie Awards — Debut Fiction 
 2015 shortlisted Miles Franklin Literary Award 
 2015 shortlisted Nita Kibble Literary Award — Dobbie Award

References

2014 Australian novels
Novels set in South Australia
Novels set in Western Australia
Novels set in Japan
Japan in non-Japanese culture
Allen & Unwin books